Moses Kiptanui (born 1 October 1970) is a Kenyan middle and long distance athlete mostly famous for 3,000 m steeplechase in which he was the number one ranked athlete from 1991 to 1995 and three time IAAF World Champion. Kiptanui was also the first man ever to run 3000m steeplechase in under eight minutes.He's also known for his coaching role in his later years with Tarbert GAA.

Career
Kiptanui emerged in 1991 as a relatively unknown athlete. He won several IAAF Grand Prix races that season. He celebrated an especially spectacular victory in Zurich where he fell on the track on the last lap but still won easily. He was known as a highly confident and somewhat cocky athlete, who was self-coached and driven by his own self belief.

His victory at the 1991 World Championships in Athletics in Tokyo therefore came as no surprise. To the great disappointment of many observers he was not included in the Kenyan team at the 1992 Summer Olympics in Barcelona. Kiptanui had failed to qualify at the Kenyan trials in Nairobi.

However, shortly after the Olympics he set a new world record over 3000m in Cologne with a time of 7:28.96 min. Only three days later he also broke the 3000m steeplechase world record in 8:02.08 in Zurich. The following year, he defended the World Championship title easily in Stuttgart. He won the steeplechase at the 1994 IAAF World Cup.

In 1995 he broke the 5000m world record in Rome in a time of 12:55.30 min (8 June). After collecting his third World Championship gold medal in Gothenburg he also set the new 3000m steeplechase record in Zurich in a time of 7:59.18 min (16 August), the first man in history to ever dip under eight minutes for the 3000m steeplechase.

A year later, he missed out on an Olympic gold medal again when he came second in the final in Atlanta. He was defeated by fellow Kenyan Joseph Keter. The next year, at the 1997 World Championships in Athletics in Athens, Greece, Kiptanui failed to win his fourth consecutive gold medal, but took silver. The winner was Wilson Boit Kipketer, also from Kenya.

He was still active in 2001 sighting the 2002 Commonwealth Games, but did not compete there. After retirement, he has been a running coach. In 2008 he coached the 2004 Olympic gold medalist, Ezekiel Kemboi. He has also been the chairman of the Marakwet District branch of Athletics Kenya.

His younger brother, Philemon Tanui, runs for University of Wyoming.

A school was built by Shoe4Africa to honor the lifetime achievements of Kiptanui.  The Shoe4Africa Moses Kiptanui School was opened in 2012 at Kamoi district, Marakwet and has eight primary classes with 320 students. Two ancillary early childhood development classes were added in 2015.

Major achievements
1990
1990 African Championships in Athletics - Cairo, Egypt.
1500m gold medal
1990 IAAF World Junior Championships - Plovdiv, Bulgaria.
1500m gold medal
1991
1991 World Championships in Athletics - Tokyo, Japan.
3000m steeplechase gold medal
1991 All-Africa Games - Cairo, Egypt.
3000m steeplechase gold medal
1993
1993 World Championships in Athletics - Stuttgart, Germany.
3000m steeplechase gold medal
1994
1994 Goodwill Games - Saint Petersburg, Russia.
5000m gold medal
1995
1995 World Championships in Athletics - Gothenburg, Sweden.
3000m steeplechase gold medal
1996
1996 Summer Olympics - Atlanta, United States of America.
3000 m steeplechase silver medal
1997
1997 World Championships in Athletics - Athens, Greece.
3000m steeplechase silver medal

References

External links

1970 births
Living people
People from Elgeyo-Marakwet County
Kenyan male middle-distance runners
Kenyan male long-distance runners
Kenyan male steeplechase runners
Olympic male steeplechase runners
Olympic athletes of Kenya
Olympic silver medalists for Kenya
Athletes (track and field) at the 1996 Summer Olympics
World record setters in athletics (track and field)
World Athletics Championships athletes for Kenya
World Athletics Championships medalists
Medalists at the 1996 Summer Olympics
Olympic silver medalists in athletics (track and field)
African Games gold medalists for Kenya
African Games medalists in athletics (track and field)
Goodwill Games medalists in athletics
Athletes (track and field) at the 1991 All-Africa Games
World Athletics Championships winners
Competitors at the 1994 Goodwill Games